The Archaeological Museum of Mykonos is a museum, in Mykonos, in Greece. Was built in 1905 to house the findings from the Putrefaction Pit of 425/426 BC, discovered in 1898 on the islet of Rheneia by D. Stavropoulos. It is one of the oldest museums in Greece and was designed by Alexandros Lykakis and funded by the Ministry of Education and the Archaeological Society of Athens. The land as donated by the Municipality of Mykonos. Its collections include exhibits dating from the Prehistoric to the Hellenistic period.

The original Neoclassical building underwent refurbishments and expansions in the 1930s and 1960s and the large eastern room was added in 1972. The museum contains artefacts from the neighbouring island Rhenia, including 9th- to 8th-century BC ceramic pottery from the Cyclades and 7th- to 6th-century BC works from other areas in the Aegean. Its most famous item is the large vase produced in Tinos, showing scenes from the fall of Troy.

References

External links

 Hellenic Ministry of Culture and Tourism
 Review of Special Exhibition
 www.planetware.com

Buildings and structures in Mykonos
Mykonos